Serra Catholic High School is a private, college preparatory, Roman Catholic high school in McKeesport, Pennsylvania.  It is located in the Roman Catholic Diocese of Pittsburgh.

History

Serra Catholic was established in September 1961 as an all-boys school by the Order of Friars Minor of the Province of the Immaculate Conception in New York City. The Order of Friars Minor of the Province of the Immaculate Conception led the school from 1961 until 1995, when the Franciscans Third Order Regular assumed the leadership role. The Third Order of Saint Francis led the school until 2004.

The school moved into its current building in 1963 and is named after St. Junípero Serra.  The school was originally all-boys but became coeducational in 1972, when Serra Catholic High School merged with Mon Yough Catholic High School.

Academics
Serra Catholic offers a rigorous, college preparatory curriculum for all students.  All courses are assigned a level, which determines how the grade is included in the student’s GPA, QPA, or both.  The levels include Level 1 (academic course with support), Level 3 (academic course), Level 5 (honors level course), Level 7 (college credit course), and Level 8 (non-academic course). 
 
The students at Serra Catholic participate in a variety of testing programs throughout their high school career.  Incoming ninth grade students take the STS High School Placement Test, which helps determine the best courses to fit their academic needs.  Students in both ninth and tenth grades take the Iowa Tests of Basic Skills during the school year.  Students in tenth and eleventh grades prepare for the SAT exams by taking the Practice Scholastic Aptitude Test.  By twelfth grade, 100% of students take the SAT exam and 15% of students take the ACT exam.

Serra Catholic is accredited through the Middle States Association of Colleges and Schools.  In addition, in September 2012, the school became a recipient of the Catholic High School Honor Roll, by the Cardinal Newman Society.  As such, Serra is listed as one of the Top 50 Catholic High Schools in the United States.

College in High School (CHS) Program

Serra Catholic offers a wide variety of college-level courses for students through four local colleges and universities.  A total of 70 College In High School Credits are available.  Many students are able to earn 24 college credits or more prior to graduation.  Some students enter college with advanced standing as sophomores, based upon the college courses successfully completed at Serra.  In addition to the college and university courses offered, two partnering schools, Seton Hill University and Saint Vincent College, have written agreements with Serra Catholic to guarantee that Serra Catholic students will be accepted into their colleges, if various academic criteria are met.

Activities

Activities and clubs are offered for Serra Catholic students.  Most activities and clubs meet one time per month during the school day, but some programs conduct meetings and participate in activities outside of school.
 
In addition to activities and clubs, Serra Catholic also hosts annual events. These include a Walk-a-Thon to support local organizations, a powderpuff football game, formal and informal dances, the March for Life in Washington, D.C., a talent show, a spring musical, and a summer trip to assist the needy in the Appalachian Mountains.

Athletics

Serra Catholic offers a variety of sports, most of which compete in the Class AA WPIAL bracket.

Fall Sports 

Soccer 
Football 
Volleyball
Golf 
Cheerleading 
Cross Country

Winter Sports 

Hockey 
Bowling 
Basketball

Spring Sports 

Baseball 
Softball 
Track & Field
 
Serra Catholic’s sports teams have won many championships over the years, including PIAA State Championships, WPIAL Championships, and Section Championships.

Alma mater

Notes and references

External links
 School website

Catholic secondary schools in Pennsylvania
Educational institutions established in 1961
Schools in Allegheny County, Pennsylvania
Education in Pittsburgh area
1961 establishments in Pennsylvania